Mangifera caesia is a species of flowering plant in the cashew family, Anacardiaceae. Known in English as jack or white mango, among other names. It belongs to the same genus as the mango and is widely cultivated in areas of Indonesia, Malaysia, Singapore, Brunei, Papua New Guinea and the Philippines.

It was featured in Malaysian stamp, printed in 1999 as a postage stamp in the rare fruits series.

Names
M. caesia is locally known as binjai (Malay language), wani (Balinese language/Dusun language), yaa-lam (Thai language), bayuno/baluno/belunok (Filipino language), mangga wani (Cebuano language/Sabah language), and gwani (Subanen language).

Description
These are restricted to wet lowlands at below 450m. It requires rainfall and is rarely in found forests but rather abundant in marshes and riverside areas. The flowers are purple or pink, 0.7 cm long with five sepals. The skin is thin and green or brown with darker patches, and the flesh is yellow-white, mushy, and strongly odorous with an acid-sweet or sour taste. The binjai is believed to originate from the island of Borneo, but is commonly grown elsewhere for its edible fruit. The tree is one of the most common and valuable Mangifera species in western Malaysia, where it is cultivated extensively in orchards. It is also widely grown in Bali, Sumatra, and Borneo.

Reproduction
This tree produces thousand of fruits, ripening three months after anthesis. The fruit matures during the rainy season, this is a deciduous, stands erect and bare before shedding large bud scales that envelops twigs and inflorescence.

Propagation method
It is propagated from seeds or through marcotting. Grafting on the seedling stock is also possible through inarching potted rootstocks onto twigs of mother trees. The mature tree requires abundant space, about 12m to 16m in either direction.

Used in dishes
The fruit of the M. caesia can be served fresh, preserved or cooked. They can be eaten dipped in chili and dark soy sauce. In Bali, it is used as an ingredient for local creamy juices, also for making spice base for chillies sambal which is eaten with river fish. it can also be used in making pickles. The wood is used for light construction.

Nutritional value
Nutritional value of binjai fruit per 100 grams:
Water 86.5g,
Protein 1g,
Fats 0.2g,
Carbohydrates including fibers 11.9g,
Ash 0.4g,
Thiamine 0.08 mg,
Beta-carotene 0.005 mg and 
Vitamin C 58 mg.
Total Energy 200kJ/100g.

As irritant
The sap of M. caesia can cause skin eruptions or dermatitis. It unripe fruits' sap can also cause irritation.

See also
Mangifera altissima (pahutan or paho mango)

References

External links

caesia
Tropical fruit
Least concern plants